Vivian Inez Archibald CBE (born 1 February 1945) is a British Virgin Islander politician and businesswoman who has served as the Deputy Governor of the British Virgin Islands since September 2008. On 21 August 2008, Meg Munn, who held the British ministerial portfolio for the Overseas Territories at the time, instructed the Governor of the British Virgin Islands to appoint Archibald as Deputy Governor. Inez Archibald took office as the British Virgin Islands' Deputy Governor on 15 September 2008.

Archibald holds a bachelor's degree in economics and business administration from Rollins College. She also received a master's degree in religion from Stetson University and a second master's degree in divinity from Emory University.

Archibald's husband of forty-eight years, prominent British Virgin Islands lawyer Joseph Archibald, died on 3 April 2014. They had three daughters.

Archibald was appointed Commander of the Order of the British Empire (CBE) in the 2015 New Year Honours.

Political offices

References

1945 births
Living people
Deputy Governors of the British Virgin Islands
Members of the House of Assembly of the British Virgin Islands
Speakers of the House of Assembly of the British Virgin Islands
British Virgin Islands politicians
British Virgin Islands women in politics
British Virgin Islands businesspeople
Candler School of Theology alumni
Stetson University alumni
Rollins College alumni
People from Road Town
Commanders of the Order of the British Empire
21st-century British women politicians